Stone Eagles, also known as the Mochary House, is located in Montclair, Essex County, New Jersey, United States. The house was built in 1929 and was added to the National Register of Historic Places on July 1, 1988.

See also
National Register of Historic Places listings in Essex County, New Jersey

References

Houses on the National Register of Historic Places in New Jersey
Houses completed in 1929
Houses in Essex County, New Jersey
Montclair, New Jersey
National Register of Historic Places in Essex County, New Jersey
New Jersey Register of Historic Places